Shenhu is a town on the southern coast of Fujian province, People's Republic of China. It sits on a peninsula, facing the Taiwan Strait to the east and the town of Yongning and Shenhu Bay to the north. It is a fishing base and trade port, and is home to a number of small appetisers from the Min Nan region. Nearby is the Jinjiang Shenhu Bay National Geopark. There are 7 communities and 12 villages under the town's administration.

References
深沪镇. Retrieved 2011-05-05

Township-level divisions of Fujian